was a feudal domain under the Tokugawa shogunate of Edo period Japan.  It is located in Shinano Province, Honshū. The domain was centered at Ueda Castle, located in what is now part of the city of Ueda in Nagano Prefecture.

History
The Sanada clan had ruled  Chiisagata District in Shinano Province during the Sengoku period under the Takeda clan and subsequently most of northern Shinano and Kōzuke Province as retainers of Toyotomi Hideyoshi. Ueda Castle was the site of two battles between the Sanada and the Tokugawa clan, notably the Siege of Ueda in 1600 when Sanada Masayuki with a force of 2000 men held off Tokugawa Hidetada's invading force of 38,000 men for so long that they arrived late for then Battle of Sekigahara. Following the establishment of the Tokugawa shogunate, Sanada Nobuyuki was confirmed as  daimyō with Ueda Domain, with holdings assessed at 95,000 koku. However, in 1622 the clan was transferred to Matsushiro Domain.

The Sanada were replaced at Ueda by Sengoku Tadamasa, formerly of Komoro Domain, with a reduction to 60,000 koku. However, Tadamasa died in 1628 before his plans to rebuild Ueda castle were realised, and his son Sengoku Tadatoshi became embroiled in a dispute over land surveys. His son, Sengoku Masaakira reduced the domain by giving 2000 koku to his younger brother before he was transferred to Izushi Domain in Tajima Province in 1706. 

Ueda Domain was then given to Matsudaira Tadachika, with an assessed kokudaka of  58,000 koku. Matsudaira Tadachika served in many important roles within the administration of Tokugawa Ieshige, including  Kyoto shoshidai from 1717 through 1724 and rōjū in 1724, His son, Matsudaira Tadazane, gave 5000 koku to his younger brother, reducing the domain to 53,000 koku. The Matsudaira clan remained in control of the domain to the Meiji restoration.

During the Boshin War, the domain sided with the imperial side, and sent forces to fight in the Battle of Hokuetsu and Battle of Aizu. In July 1871, with the abolition of the han system, Ueda Domain briefly became Ueda Prefecture, and was merged into the newly created Nagano Prefecture. Under the new Meiji government, Matsudaira Tadanari, the last daimyo of Ueda Domain went to study at Rutgers University and was given the kazoku peerage title of shishaku (viscount).

Bakumatsu period holdings
As with most domains in the han system, Ueda Domain consisted of several discontinuous territories calculated to provide the assigned kokudaka, based on periodic cadastral surveys and projected agricultural yields.
Shinano Province
5 villages in Sarashina District
106 villages in Chiisagata District

List of daimyō

See also
List of Han

References
The content of this article was largely derived from that of the corresponding article on Japanese Wikipedia.

External links
"Ueda" on "Edo 300 HTML"

Notes

Domains of Japan
History of Nagano Prefecture
Shinano Province
Fujii-Matsudaira clan
Sanada clan